WMACS, or the Washington Metropolitan Association of Chinese Schools, is (as its name implies) an organization of Chinese Language Schools in the Baltimore-Washington metropolitan area. WMACS facilitates communication amongst its member schools and is a member association of the National Council of Associations of Chinese Language Schools (see external links). WMACS also sponsors teacher workshops and speech and calligraphy contests for students, and also hosts an annual field day and track meet for its member schools.

"WMACS" is also often used to refer to the annual summer camp that the organization sponsors for Chinese-speaking youth between the ages of 8 and 18. This popular weeklong residential camp has been offered since 1989, and often sees campers returning as counselors after graduating high school. The camp has been held at:
American University 1989
Towson University 1990
Salisbury State University 1991-1995
Camp Hemlock, VA 1996
Frostburg State University 1997–Present

Member institutions
中華聖經教會中文學校 Chinese Bible Church of Maryland Chinese School (CBCM-CS)
巴城中文學校 Chinese Language School of Baltimore
哥城中文學校 Chinese Language School of Columbia
德立華中文學校 Chinese School of Delaware
德明中文學校 
實驗中文學校 Experimental Chinese School
蓋城中文學校 Gaithersburg Chinese School
黎明中文學校 The Li-Ming Chinese Academy
新世界雙語學院 New World Bilingual Institute
北維中文學校 Northern Virginia Chinese School
博城中文學校 Potomac Chinese School
光華中文學校 Richmond Chinese School
洛城中文學校 Rockville Chinese School
駐美代表處中文學校 TECRO Chinese School
華府慈濟人文學校 Tzu Chi Academy DC
華府台灣語文學校 Washington DC Taiwanese School
光啟中文學校 Washington Kuang Chi Chinese School
華府中文學校 Washington School of Chinese Language and Culture
維華中文學校 Wei Hwa Chinese School
明德中文學校
黑堡中文學校

External links
WMACS Website
WMACS Summer Camp Website
National Council of Associations of Chinese Language Schools

Asian-American culture in Maryland
Asian-American culture in Virginia
Asian-American culture in Washington, D.C.
United States schools associations
Chinese-American organizations
Language schools in the United States
Education in Maryland
Education in Washington, D.C.
Schools of Chinese as a second or foreign language